Rufforth is a village in the unitary authority of the City of York in North Yorkshire, England. The village is mentioned in the Domesday Book and dates from Saxon times.

Rufforth is the larger village in the civil parish of Rufforth with Knapton. The parish also includes the village of Knapton, and the Trenchard Road Estate on the edge of Acomb, York.

According to the 2001 census the parish of Rufforth with Knapton had a population of 950 of which 560 lived in Rufforth. In the 2011 census the parish of Rufforth with Knapton had a population of 1,029 of which 633 lived in Rufforth.

History

The first record of a mill at Rufforth goes back to 1671. In 1868 J. Clayton, Esq. is recorded as being the lord of the manor and the chief landowner. According to the census of 1881, the population was 272.

RAF Rufforth was a purpose-built bomber airfield built to Class A specification. It was constructed during 1941 and opened on 10 June 1942 for use by Operational Training Units and later a Heavy Conversion Unit flying Halifaxes. The site remained in RAF hands until they finally departed in 1974. In July 1981 the site was sold and is now the site of the York Gliding Centre. and a microlight flying club.

Rufforth was historically a parish in the West Riding of Yorkshire.  In 1974 it was transferred to the Harrogate district in the new county of North Yorkshire.  In 1988 the civil parish absorbed the civil parish of Knapton, and the parish was subsequently renamed Rufforth with Knapton.  In 1996 the parish was transferred to the City of York.

Governance

Rufforth lies within the Rural West York ward of the City of York Unitary Authority. As of the 2019 elections it is represented by Councillors Anne Hook and James Barker who are both members of the local Liberal Democrat Party. It is a part of the UK Parliamentary Constituency of York Outer.  Until January 2020 it also fell within the boundaries of the Yorkshire and the Humber European Parliament constituency.
Rufforth forms part of the Rufforth with Knapton Parish Council area and elects five of the eight councillors.

Economy

Rufforth was a traditional farming community with seven farms during the 1970s, but because of agricultural decline there are now only two left within the village curtilage. The village is a dormitory for commuters in the nearby cities of York, Harrogate and Leeds, with only a few local jobs. The village has one public house, The Tankard, a village shop and a tea room A post office now runs two mornings a week from the Methodist Chapel.  The villages other pub the Buck Inn was converted into houses in the late 1990s.

Transport

Harrogate Coach Travel buses run through the village as part of the York to Harrogate / Harrogate to York route.

Geography
The soil is principally clay with a sandy ridge, on which the village was built, and a high water table. Around the end of the nineteenth century, most of the land was pasture with grazing cattle. Produce was mainly barley, oats and turnips. A variety of plants, especially within several wooded areas near the village, can be found. Roe Deer are resident in surrounding woodland and birds of prey such as Barn Owl, Little Owl, Tawny Owl and Buzzard are commonly seen. The surrounding landscape also provide a habitat for many lowland farmland birds including Lapwing, Curlew, Grey Partridge and Skylark. There is a small village green near the village shop where the village post box is cited. There are some 50 allotments run by the Parish Council. Sand Dyke Nature Reserve lies to the North West of the village.

Education

A non-denominational school was built in about 1870 for 60 pupils. This later became Rufforth Primary School, which in 2010 accommodated about 60-65 pupils and had an intake of 14 children each year. The Primary School reached 100 pupils around 2016. Pre-school facilities are provided in the village hall.

For secondary education, the village is in the catchment area of York High School on Cornlands Road in nearby Acomb.

Religion

All Saints' Church has been the parish church since the 12th century and has been rebuilt and restored several times. A Wesleyan chapel was also built in 1843 and was restored in 1884.

Sports

To the South East of the village are playing fields with a pavilion. This is the home ground of Rufforth United whose 1st XI, as of 2010, play in the York Football League Division One. Rufforth Cricket Club also play their home fixtures at the Wetherby Road Arena near the airfield. The first team play in Division 2 and the second team play in Division 4 of York Senior league setup.

Agriculture

Agriculture has played a major role in the development of Rufforth. Due to Rufforth's close proximity to York the production of fresh goods for transport into the city became a viable and profitable option for local farmers.

The dairy industry was a major contributor to the local economy until the decline in profitability led to many small dairy farms to cease production. There is now only one dairy farm left within the Rufforth parish.

Rufforth's surrounding farmland is now mainly used for a mixture of livestock, cereal and root vegetable enterprises. When travelling around the Rufforth area you will notice large numbers of beef cattle, sheep in lower numbers and a thriving equine industry.

Sown cereals are mainly autumn and spring sown barley, wheat, maize and oilseed rape. Other large contributors to local agriculture are potatoes and sugarbeet (although sugarbeet quantities have sharply declined after the closure of the British Sugar Factory in York).

Notable landmarks and residents
The Lord of the Manor of Rufforth, Henry Justice was exiled for stealing books in the 1700s.

On Rufforth Airfield the old control tower still stands and was used in the TV drama series Airline during the 1980s.

A little way out of the village is Rufforth Hall built in 1860 and was used by a local York insurance company as a sports venue for its employees.

There are currently four listed building/features within Rufforth. These are The village pump and trough (listed Grade II), Church of All Saints (listed Grade II), Pear Tree Farmhouse (listed Grade II) and The Pinfold (listed Grade II).

The British actor Mark Addy was a longtime resident of the village.

See also
 Rufforth Circuit
 RAF Rufforth

References

External links

 
Villages in the City of York
Former civil parishes in North Yorkshire